Acropora is a genus of small polyp stony coral in the phylum Cnidaria. Some of its species are known as table coral, elkhorn coral, and staghorn coral. Over 149 species are described. Acropora species are some of the major reef corals responsible for building the immense calcium carbonate substructure that supports the thin living skin of a reef.

Anatomy and distribution 

Depending on the species and location, Acropora species may grow as plates or slender or broad branches.  Like other corals, Acropora corals are colonies of individual polyps, which are about 2 mm across and share tissue and a nerve net.  The polyps can withdraw back into the coral in response to movement or disturbance by potential predators, but when undisturbed, they protrude slightly.  The polyps typically extend further at night to help capture plankton and organic matter from the water.

The species are distributed in the Indo-Pacific (over 100 species) and Caribbean (3 species). However, the true number of species is unknown: firstly, the validity of many of these species is questioned as some have been shown to represent hybrids, for example Acropora prolifera; and secondly, some species have been shown to represent cryptic species complexes.

Threats 

Symbiodinium, symbiotic algae, live in the corals' cells and produce energy for the animals through photosynthesis. Environmental destruction has led to a dwindling of populations of Acropora, along with other coral species.  Acropora is especially susceptible to bleaching when stressed. Bleaching is due to the loss of the coral's zooxanthellae, which are a golden-brown color. Bleached corals are stark white and may die if new Symbiodinium cells cannot be assimilated. Common causes of bleaching and coral death include pollution, abnormally warm water temperatures, increased ocean acidification, sedimentation, and eutrophication.

In 2014 the U.S. Fish and Wildlife Service listed ten Acropora species as 'threatened'.

Reef-keeping 

Most Acropora species are brown or green, but a few are brightly colored, and those rare corals are prized by aquarists. Captive propagation of Acropora is widespread in the reef-keeping community. Given the right conditions, many Acropora species grow quickly, and individual colonies can exceed a meter across in the wild. In a well-maintained reef aquarium, finger-sized fragments can grow into medicine ball-sized colonies in one to two years. Captive specimens are steadily undergoing changes due to selection which enable them to thrive in the home aquarium. In some cases, fragments of captive specimens are used to repopulate barren reefs in the wild.

Acropora species are challenging to keep in a home aquarium. They require bright light, stable temperatures, regular addition of calcium and alkalinity supplements, and clean, turbulent water.

Common parasites of colonies in reef aquariums are "Acropora-eating flatworms" Amakusaplana acroporae, and "red bugs" (Tegastes acroporanus).

Species 

The following species are recognised in the genus Acropora:
Acropora abrolhosensis Veron, 1985 	
Acropora abrotanoides (Lamarck, 1816)	
Acropora acervata (Dana, 1846)
Acropora aculeus (Dana, 1846)
Acropora acuminata (Verrill, 1864)
Acropora alvarezi† Wallace, 2008
Acropora anglica† (Duncan, 1866)
Acropora anthocercis (Brook, 1893)
Acropora arabensis Hodgson and Carpenter, 1995
Acropora arafura Wallace, Done & Muir, 2012
Acropora aspera (Dana, 1846)
Acropora austera (Dana, 1846)
Acropora awi Wallace and Wolstenholme, 1998 	
Acropora bartonensis† Wallace, 2008
Acropora batunai Wallace, 1997
Acropora borneoensis† (Felix, 1921)
Acropora branchi Riegl, 1995
Acropora britannica† Wallace, 2008
Acropora bushyensis Veron and Wallace, 1984
Acropora capillaris (Klunzinger, 1879)
Acropora cardenae Wells, 1986 	
Acropora carduus (Dana, 1846)	
Acropora caroliniana Nemenzo, 1976
Acropora cerealis (Dana, 1846)	
Acropora cervicornis (Lamarck, 1816) - staghorn coral	
Acropora chesterfieldensis Veron and Wallace, 1984 	
Acropora clathrata (Brook, 1891)
Acropora cytherea (Dana, 1846)
Acropora darrellae† Santodomingo, Wallace & Johnson, 2015
Acropora deformis† (Michelin, 1840)
Acropora dendrum (Bassett-Smith, 1890)
Acropora derawaensis Wallace, 1997
Acropora desalwii Wallace, 1994 
Acropora digitifera (Dana, 1846)
Acropora divaricata (Dana, 1846)
Acropora donei Veron and Wallace, 1984
Acropora downingi Wallace, 1999
Acropora duncani† (Reuss, 1866)
Acropora echinata (Dana, 1846)	
Acropora elegans (Milne-Edwards and Haime, 1860)
Acropora elenae† Santodomingo, Wallace & Johnson, 2015
Acropora elseyi (Brook, 1892)
Acropora emanuelae† Santodomingo, Wallace & Johnson, 2015
Acropora eurystoma (Klunzinger, 1879)
Acropora fastigata Nemenzo, 1967
Acropora fennemai† (Gerth, 1921) 
Acropora fenneri Veron, 2000
Acropora filiformis Veron, 2000
Acropora florida (Dana, 1846)
Acropora gemmifera (Brook, 1892)
Acropora glauca (Brook, 1893)
Acropora globiceps (Dana, 1846)
Acropora gomezi Veron, 2000
Acropora grandis (Brook, 1892)
Acropora granulosa (Milne-Edwards and Haime, 1860) 
Acropora haidingeri† (Reuss, 1864)	
Acropora halmaherae Wallace and Wolstenholme, 1998
Acropora hasibuani† Santodomingo, Wallace & Johnson, 2015
Acropora hemprichii (Ehrenberg, 1834)
Acropora herklotsi† (Reuss, 1866)
Acropora hoeksemai Wallace, 1997
Acropora horrida (Dana, 1846)
Acropora humilis (Dana, 1846)
Acropora hyacinthus (Dana, 1846)
Acropora indonesia Wallace, 1997
Acropora intermedia (Brook, 1891)
Acropora jacquelineae Wallace, 1994
Acropora japonica Veron, 2000
Acropora kimbeensis Wallace, 1999
Acropora kirstyae Veron and Wallace, 1984	
Acropora kosurini Wallace, 1994
Acropora lamarcki Veron, 2000
Acropora latistella (Brook, 1892)
Acropora laurae† Santodomingo, Wallace & Johnson, 2015
Acropora lavandulina† (Michelin, 1840)
Acropora listeri (Brook, 1893)
Acropora loisetteae Wallace, 1994
Acropora lokani Wallace, 1994
Acropora longicyathus (Milne-Edwards and Haime, 1860)	
Acropora loripes (Brook, 1892)
Acropora lovelli Veron and Wallace, 1984
Acropora lutkeni Crossland, 1952
Acropora macrocalyx† Wallace & Bosselini, 2015
Acropora microclados (Ehrenberg, 1834)
Acropora microphthalma (Verrill, 1869)
Acropora millepora (Ehrenberg, 1834)
Acropora monticulosa (Brueggemann, 1879)	
Acropora mossambica Riegl, 1995
Acropora multiacuta Nemenzo, 1967
Acropora muricata (Linnaeus, 1758)
Acropora nana (Studer, 1878)
Acropora nasuta (Dana, 1846)
Acropora natalensis Riegl, 1995
Acropora ornata† (DeFrance, 1828)
Acropora palmata (Lamarck, 1816) - elkhorn coral	
Acropora palmerae Wells, 1954
Acropora paniculata Verrill, 1902
Acropora papillare Latypov, 1992
Acropora pectinata Veron, 2000
Acropora pharaonis (Milne-Edwards and Haime, 1860)
Acropora pichoni Wallace, 1999
Acropora piedmontensis† Wallace & Bosselini, 2015	
Acropora plumosa Wallace and Wolstenholme, 1998 
Acropora polystoma (Brook, 1891)
Acropora prolifera (Lamarck, 1816) - fused staghorn coral	
Acropora proteacea† Wallace, 2008
Acropora proximalis Veron, 2000
Acropora pulchra (Brook, 1891)
Acropora renemai† Santodomingo, Wallace & Johnson, 2015
Acropora retusa  (Dana, 1846)
Acropora ridzwani  Ditlev, 2003
Acropora robusta (Dana, 1846)
Acropora roemeri† (Duncan, 1866)
Acropora rongelapensis Richards & Wallace, 2004
Acropora roseni Wallace, 1999
Acropora rudis (Rehberg, 1892)
Acropora rufa Veron, 2000
Acropora russelli Wallace, 1994
Acropora salentina† Wallace & Bosselini, 2015
Acropora samoensis (Brook, 1891)
Acropora sarmentosa (Brook, 1892)
Acropora secale (Studer, 1878)
Acropora selago (Studer, 1878)
Acropora seriata (Ehrenberg, 1834)
Acropora serrata Lamarck
Acropora simplex Wallace and Wolstenholme, 1998
Acropora sirikitiae Wallace, Phongsuwan & Muir, 2012
Acropora slovenica† Wallace & Bosselini, 2015
Acropora solanderi† (Defrance, 1828)
Acropora solitaryensis Veron and Wallace, 1984
Acropora sordiensis Riegl, 1995
Acropora spathulata (Brook, 1891)
Acropora speciosa (Quelch, 1886)
Acropora spicifera (Dana, 1846)
Acropora squarrosa (Ehrenberg, 1834)	
Acropora striata (Verrill, 1866)
Acropora subglabra (Brook, 1891)
Acropora subulata (Dana, 1846)
Acropora suharsonoi Wallace, 1994 	
Acropora sukarnoi Wallace, 1997 
Acropora tanegashimensi -s Veron, 1990
Acropora tenella (Brook, 1892)
Acropora tenuis (Dana, 1846)
Acropora torihalimeda Wallace, 1994	
Acropora tortuosa (Dana, 1846)
Acropora tuberculosa (Milne Edwards, 1860)
Acropora turaki Wallace, 1994 
Acropora valenciennesi (Milne-Edwards and Haime, 1860)	
Acropora valida (Dana, 1846)
Acropora variolosa (Klunzinger, 1879)
Acropora vaughani Wells, 1954
Acropora verweyi Veron and Wallace, 1984	
Acropora walindii Wallace, 1999
Acropora willisae Veron and Wallace, 1984
Acropora wilsonae† Wallace, 2008	
Acropora yongei Veron and Wallace, 1984

References

Further reading

External links 

 

 
Acroporidae
Coral reefs
Articles containing video clips
Scleractinia genera